Remote Year is a company that facilitates travel and accommodations for people working or interested in working remotely. For $2,000-3,000 per month, Remote Year organizes accommodation, workspaces and professional and local activities to enable participants to travel while continuing to work and to foster a sense of community amongst the group traveling together. The program includes a 12-month trip across 12 cities in various countries. across four continents Remote Year has hosted employees from over 300 companies participating in the program.

History
Greg Caplan and Sam Pessin launched Remote Year in 2014, after finding it difficult to travel with friends whose work schedules didn't allow for the ability to travel freely. Prior to launching the company, Caplan founded the fashion company, oBaz, which was eventually acquired by Groupon, where Caplan remained until 2013.

Applications for the first Remote Year program opened in December 2014. Over 50,000 people signed up to be notified when the application went live. Three days after the site launched, there were 3,000 inquiries from potential applicants and 15 companies interested in hiring workers participating in the program. For each of its programs, Remote Year arranges travel between cities, housing, co-working spaces with Wi-Fi, and personal and professional group activities.

In summer 2015, Remote Year facilitated the first program for 75 participants. The initial group received over 25,000 applicants, from 40 different countries ranging from 22 to 65 years old. The trip, which started that June in Prague, included Ljubljana, Cavtat, Istanbul, Penang, Ko Pha-ngan, Hanoi, Kyoto, Buenos Aires, Montevideo, Santiago and Lima. The second trip left the US in February 2016 and began in South America. The third group, which left in June 2016, was scheduled for destinations including Prague, Czech Republic; Lisbon, Portugal; and Buenos Aires, Argentina.

In October 2016, Remote Year received Series A funding led by Highland Capital Partners with participation by Airbnb co-founder Nathan Blecharczyk, and Flybridge Capital Partners. At that point, Remote Year had worked with employees from over 100 companies, including 20 from the Fortune 500 and employed 85 people around the world. Remote Year has developed co-working spaces for its programs in locations such as Croatia in order to scale company operations.

In October 2020, Selina, a Panama-based hospitality brand, acquired Remote Year for an undisclosed amount.

References

Transport companies established in 2014